A Maximal arc in a finite projective plane is a largest possible (k,d)-arc in that projective plane. If the finite projective plane has order q (there are q+1 points on any line), then for a maximal arc, k, the number of points of the arc, is the maximum possible (= qd + d - q) with the property that no d+1 points of the arc lie on the same line.

Definition
Let  be a finite projective plane of order q (not necessarily desarguesian).

Some authors permit the degree of a maximal arc to be 1, q or even q+ 1. Letting K be a maximal (k, d)-arc in a projective plane of order q, if 
 d = 1, K is a point of the plane,
 d = q, K is the complement of a line (an affine plane of order q), and
 d = q + 1, K is the entire projective plane.
All of these cases are considered to be trivial examples of maximal arcs, existing in any type of projective plane for any value of q. When 2 ≤ d ≤ q- 1, the maximal arc is called non-trivial, and the definition given above and the properties listed below all refer to non-trivial maximal arcs.

Properties
 The number of lines through a fixed point p, not on a maximal arc K, intersecting K in d points, equals .  Thus, d divides q.
 In the special case of d = 2, maximal arcs are known as hyperovals which can only exist if q is even.
 An arc K having one fewer point than a maximal arc can always be uniquely extended to a maximal arc by adding to K the point at which all the lines meeting K in d - 1 points meet.
 In PG(2,q) with q odd, no non-trivial maximal arcs exist.
 In PG(2,2h), maximal arcs for every degree 2t, 1 ≤ t ≤ h exist.

Partial geometries
One can construct partial geometries, derived from maximal arcs:

 Let K be a maximal arc with degree d. Consider the incidence structure , where P contains all points of the projective plane not on K, B contains all line of the projective plane intersecting K in d points, and the incidence I is the natural inclusion.  This is a partial geometry : .
 Consider the space  and let K a maximal arc of degree  in a two-dimensional subspace .

Notes

References
 
 
 
 
 

Projective geometry